Mexican-Colorado Navigation Company was a steam navigation company formed in Los Angeles, California, that operated on the Colorado River from 1901 to 1907.  It was owned by Alphonso B. Smith, W. S. Twogood, and E. E. Busby.  It ran the steamboats, Retta (1900-1905), St. Vallier (1901-1907), and San Jorge (1901), from Yuma, Arizona.

References

Steamboat transport on the Colorado River
Steamboats of Arizona
Steamboats of California
Transportation companies based in California
American companies established in 1901
Transport companies established in 1901
Transport companies disestablished in 1907
1901 establishments in California
1907 disestablishments in California
Defunct companies based in Greater Los Angeles
Maritime history of California